Jhon Anderson Rodríguez Salazar (born 12 October 1996 in Manizales) is a Colombian cyclist, who currently rides for UCI Continental team .

Major results
2013
 1st  Time trial, National Junior Road Championships
2014
 1st  Team (with Brandon Rivera), Youth Olympic Games 
2016
 1st Stage 5 Tour de l'Avenir
 Pan American Under-23 Road Championships
3rd Road race
3rd Time trial
2017 
 1st  Young rider classification Tour d'Azerbaïdjan

References

External links

1996 births
Living people
Colombian male cyclists
Youth Olympic gold medalists for Colombia
Cyclists at the 2014 Summer Youth Olympics
People from Manizales